Barbara Carr (born Barbara Jean Crosby, January 9, 1941) is an American blues singer.

Biography
Barbara Carr was born in St Louis, Missouri, United States, and, like many blues musicians, she got her start in church, performing with her two sisters. At age 16, she formed the Comets, a band that performed cover tunes. Her break came when a brother-in-law working in Gaslight Square said bandleader Oliver Sain was looking for a female vocalist to replace Fontella Bass. Carr got the job, which eventually led to her first solo recording contract with Chess Records in Chicago, Illinois, in 1966.

Carr and husband, Charles Carr, soon started their own record label, Bar-Car.  Their first recordings included Good Woman Go Bad and Street Woman. She continued to record intermittently and performed with Sain until 1972, when she temporarily retired to raise a family.

After returning to perform with local bands around St Louis, she again began recording but with little success.  With her husband, she set up her own record label, Bar-Car, in 1982, and recorded a number of singles at Muscle Shoals, Alabama, which provided the basis for her first album, Good Woman Go Bad, in 1989.  A second album, Street Woman, followed in 1992.   In 1996, Carr signed with Ecko Records, which produced such songs as "Footprints on the Ceiling", "The Bo Hawg Grind", "If You Can't Cut The Mustard", "The Right Kind Of Love", and "Bone Me Like You Own Me".  While still with Ecko Records, Carr recorded "What A Woman Wants", "Let A Real Woman Try", "Rainbow", "The Best Woman", and "Stroke It".  Carr recorded eight albums with Ecko, including a best of compilation album, The Best of Barbara Carr.

Carr has been honored twice with the Living Blues Readers Award as 'Female Blues Artist of the Year'. Her 2012 release, Keep The Fire Burning, on Catfood Records, reached top ten on both the Living Blues Report and the Roots Music Report. It was selected one of Down Beat magazine's Best Albums of the Year. Carr was on the cover of the November–December 2012 issue of Living Blues and was featured in that issue.

In 2013 and 2014, Carr was nominated for a Blues Music Award in the 'Soul Blues Female Artist' category.

Albums
Good Woman Go Bad - Bar-Car Records, 1989
Street Woman - Bar-Car, 1992
Footprints on the Ceiling - Ecko Records, 1997
Bone Me Like You Own Me - Ecko, 1998
What a Woman Wants - Ecko, 1999
Stroke It - Ecko, 2000
The Best Woman - Ecko, 2001			
On My Own - Bar-Car/Hollister Entertainment Group, 2002
Talk to Me - Mardi Gras Records, 2003
The Best of Barbara Carr - Ecko, 2003 (compilation)
Down Low Brother - Ecko, 2006
It's My Time... - Ecko, 2007
Savvy Woman - CDS Records, 2009
Southern Soul Blues Sisters (with Uvee Hayes) - Aviara Music, 2009
The Best of Barbara Carr, Vol. 2 - Ecko, 2011 (compilation)
Keeps the Fire Burning - Catfood Records, 2012

References

External links
 Ecko Records
 

1941 births
Living people
American blues singers
American women singers
St. Louis blues musicians
Chess Records artists
Musicians from St. Louis
Singers from Missouri
21st-century American women